Florent Vanverberghe (born 22 July 2000) is a French rugby union player, who plays for Castres Olympique.

Biography 
Florent Vanverberghe was called by Fabien Galthié to the French national team for the first time in June 2021, for the Australia summer tour.

References

External links
 

2000 births
Living people
French rugby union players
Castres Olympique players
People from La Seyne-sur-Mer
Rugby union locks
Sportspeople from Var (department)